Kalateh-ye Shiru (also Romanized as Kalāteh-ye Shīrū) is a village in Raz Rural District, Raz and Jargalan District, Bojnord County, North Khorasan Province, Iran. At the 2006 census, its population was 19, in 6 families.

References 

Populated places in Bojnord County